Michael Mann is an American filmmaker known for directing, producing, and writing various works of film and television.

Filmography

Films

Short films 
 Insurrection (1968)
 Jaunpuri (1971)
 17 Days Down the Line (1972)

Feature films

Television
TV series

TV movies

Unrealized projects
James Dean biopic - On September 8, 1993, Mann was attached to direct the James Dean biopic with Israel Horovitz writing the script and Leonardo DiCaprio set to star, but Mark Rydell finished the movie for TNT in 2001.
Kiss Me Deadly remake - Robert Rodriguez said on the director's commentary track for Sin City, that he had been attached, in 1997 or 1998, to direct a remake of the 1955 film noir, Kiss Me Deadly with Mann attached to produce, but Rodriguez said he left the project because he thought it was "too nostalgic" for the first movie.
The Aviator - On June 24, 1999, Mann was attached to direct DiCaprio in John Logan’s script The Aviator, but Martin Scorsese took over directing the project and Mann stayed as a producer.
Gates of Fire - In late 1999, Mann was attached to direct the film adaptation of Gates of Fire with David Self writing the script.
Arms and the Man - On October 27, 2003, it was reported that Mann was set to direct and produce the film adaptation of Peter Landesman’s article Arms and the Man about Viktor Bout for Universal Pictures, but “Movie Insider” lists it as complete and available on home media, despite the fact that the movie was never made.
Fortune’s Fools - On March 14, 2004, it was reported that Mann was at one point set to direct the crime drama Fortune’s Fools for Working Title Films and Universal Pictures, but moved onto other film and TV projects.
Hancock (fka Tonight, He Comes) – Mann was once attached to direct Hancock under its original title Tonight, He Comes, but directed Miami Vice instead.
Damage Control – a drama about a sports agent with Jamie Foxx was attached to star was speculated that Damage Control would start after the release of Public Enemies.
Death of a Dissident - the novel about the life and assassination of Alexander Litvinenko for Columbia Pictures, which was in a bidding war against Warner Bros., Graham King and Johnny Depp.
Untitled 1930’s Noir - a film involving Louis B. Mayer with John Logan writing the script and DiCaprio was attached to star, but New Line Cinema cancelled the movie since the estimated $120 million budget proved too expensive and too risky to get made.
Empire - a drama about a modern global media mogul with John Logan writing the script and Will Smith was attached to star as the lead.
Frankie Machine – an adaptation of Don Winslow’s novel The Winter of Frankie Machine, until William Friedkin took over directing duties from Mann.
Waiting for Robert Capa - the film adaptation of Susana Fortes’ book about Capa’s two-year romance with Gerda Taro, with Jez Butterworth writing the script. On April 2, 2010, Eva Green revealed that she will star as Taro. In December of that year, Gemma Arterton was cast as Taro and Andrew Garfield was rumored to portray Capa.  On December 13, 2012, Arterton revealed in an interview at Marrakech Film Festival that she is starring in Paul Andrew Williams’ Capa biopic instead of Waiting for Robert Capa.
Azincourt – an adaptation of the Bernard Cornwell novel Azincourt described as Mann’s passion project with script revisions by Benjamin Ross and Stuart Hazeldine.
Big Tuna - a biopic about Sam Giancana replacing Tony Accardo. In December that same year, Sheldon Turner was set to write the script. On March 18, 2016, Mann revealed that he will co-write the script with Don Winslow and will also publish a novelization of the script.
Go Like Hell - an adaptation of A.J. Baime's novel Go Like Hell with Brad Pitt in talks to star in the film, until October 23, 2013, Joseph Kosinski replaced Mann as the film’s director.
Gold – a film about a prospector, which he chose to direct Blackhat instead.
The Big Stone Grid - a spec script written by S. Craig Zahler, until it was acquired by Lotus Entertainment and Pierre Morel replaced Mann as director.
The Tam - a film set in the South China Sea.
Buda Bridge TV series - On August 8, 2012, Mann and Mark Johnson were reported to co-produce Michael R. Roskam’s sci-fi crime TV series Buda Bridge for HBO.
Hue 1968 TV miniseries - Mann and Michael De Luca were reported to co-produce the TV miniseries adaptation of Mark Bowden‘s novel Hue 1968 for FX.
Comanche - the western biopic of Cynthia Parker.

Offers
The Lookout - Mann was the last director offered the chance to direct Scott Frank‘s script The Lookout during a lunch with Frank, before it became Frank’s directorial debut.

References 

 
American filmographies
Director filmographies